Heartbound may refer to:

 Heartbound (album), an album by Dream On, Dreamer
 Heartbound (video game), a role-playing video game by Pirate Software